Ismail Ibragimovich Ediyev (born 16 February 1988) is a Russian professional footballer. He plays as a centre-back.

Club career
He made his professional debut in the Russian Premier League for FC Terek Grozny on 6 November 2005 in a game against FC Lokomotiv Moscow.

Career statistics

Notes

External links

References

1988 births
People from Groznensky District
Living people
Russian footballers
Association football defenders
FC Akhmat Grozny players
Russian Premier League players
Russian people of Chechen descent
FC Fakel Voronezh players
FC Chernomorets Novorossiysk players
Chechen people
FC Mordovia Saransk players
FC SKA-Khabarovsk players
FC Rotor Volgograd players
FC Tom Tomsk players
FC Novokuznetsk players
FC Nizhny Novgorod (2015) players
FC Urozhay Krasnodar players
Sportspeople from Chechnya